Richard Raymond Finch (born January 23, 1954) is an American songwriter, producer, engineer, and song arranger. He is best known as the co-founder, producer and former bass guitar player of KC and the Sunshine Band. Along with Harry Wayne Casey, he co-wrote six No. 1 Billboard Hot 100 hits.

Biography 

Born in Indianapolis, Indiana, Finch's family moved to Hialeah, Florida, when he was an infant. At five years old and the second youngest of five children, Finch's father died unexpectedly leaving his mother to raise Finch and his four siblings alone. His favorite group growing up was The Beatles. His musical tastes grew to include soul and country and western music. In his early teens, Finch got his first electric bass guitar and began to learn country music bass lines. He joined several country bands before joining the band Ball & Chain.

Finch became interested in audio recording techniques while working at an Opa Locka, Florida electronics and record store. A schoolmate introduced him to the singer-songwriter Clarence Reid from TK Records. His high school attendance suffered as he spent every free moment at TK Records and unbeknownst to his mother, he dropped out of high school his sophomore year and shortly thereafter was hired as a part-time recording engineer for the label. Henry Stone and Clarence Reid introduced Finch to Harry Wayne Casey, three years his senior, who was hired to work in the shipping department and act as TK's occasional receptionist. Prior to his introduction to Casey, Finch had already established himself at TK as a skilled engineer, with numerous singles recorded before the age of 17, including various tracks for the Allman Brothers and Mother's Finest.

Within weeks of meeting, the Finch-Casey songwriting collaboration began, with their first hit songs recorded by Betty Wright ("Where is the Love") and George McCrae ("Rock Your Baby"). Finch then assembled the future Sunshine Band members, utilizing his already-established friendships with TK session musicians, guitarist Jerome Smith and drummer Robert Johnson. The Finch–Casey collaboration produced numerous hits, including "(Shake, Shake, Shake) Shake Your Booty," "Get Down Tonight," "Please Don't Go" and "Boogie Shoes."

Criminal convictions
On March 23, 2010, Finch was arrested in Newark, Ohio, accused of having inappropriate contact with a 17-year-old male. Police stated that during an interview, he admitted to having inappropriate contact with that teen, and other teens aged 13 to 17.

At his bond hearing on April 6, 2010, Finch entered a plea of not guilty to all charges. In December 2010, Finch pleaded "no contest" and was sentenced to seven years' imprisonment. He served his sentence in Chillicothe Correctional Institution, a medium-security state prison in Ohio, and was released on March 13, 2017. In April 2019, Finch received a parole infraction notice which modified his post-incarceration sentence and added an additional seven months to his parole, which was set to end in October 2022.

Intellectual Property Lawsuit
In October 2021, exercising his right under Federal Law to terminate a prior assignment of his co-created musical compositions, Finch sued Sony Music Publishing to reclaim his fifty percent ownership rights and royalties to the songs he co-wrote with Harry Wayne Casey. On January 11, 2022, the lawsuit was moved to the US District Court for the Southern District of Florida. On February 23, 2022, EMI Consortium Songs, Inc. was removed from the complaint, with Harry Wayne Casey (Finch's co-writer) remaining as the sole defendant.

Legacy
Finch is a multi-Grammy Award winner with three wins and nine nominations and was nominated in the 2010 first round Grammy ballot as producer. He is the recipient of an American Music Award and a star on the Hollywood Walk of Fame having been a part of the KC and the Sunshine Band legacy. In October 2010, Finch became a nominee to the Songwriters Hall of Fame.

Discography 
With the KC and the Sunshine Band
Do It Good (1974)
KC and the Sunshine Band (1975)
The Sound of Sunshine (1975)
Part 3 (1976)
Who Do Ya Love (1978)
Do You Wanna Go Party (1979)
Space Cadet Solo Flight (1981)
The Painter (1981)
All in a Night's Work (1982)
KC Ten (1983)

As songwriter 
Writer: H.W. Casey & R. Finch
"You Get Me Hot" (1979) - Jimmy "Bo" Horne
"Goin' Home for Love" (1979)  - Jimmy "Bo" Horne 
"I Get Lifted" (1979)  - Jimmy "Bo" Horne 
"Without You" (1979)  - Jimmy "Bo" Horne

See also
Henry Stone
Hamilton Bohannon

References

External links

1954 births
American people convicted of child sexual abuse
Grammy Award winners
KC and the Sunshine Band members
Living people
People from Hialeah, Florida
Musicians from Indianapolis
Guitarists from Indiana
20th-century American bass guitarists
People from Heath, Ohio
Guitarists from Ohio